The Santa Fe–Coronda Marathon (formal name Coronda River Aquatic Marathon; in ) is a 57-kilometer open water swimming race that takes place on the Coronda and Salado rivers (both tributaries of the Paraná River) in Argentina. The race joins the cities of Santa Fe, Santo Tomé and Coronda, in Argentina's Santa Fe Province. The race has a total length of about 57 km and an expected run time of about 8 hours. It is held yearly in the summer (January or February).

The most recent edition of the race was held on Sunday, January 31, 2010; it was the 37th edition.

The first competition took place on 22 January 1961 under the name of "Fluvial Marathon of the Argentine Littoral". The marathon was not held, due to economic problems and/or varied political troubles, in 1968, 1969, 1971–1973, 1980–1986, and 1989. Since the 1990s (and ) it has been celebrated annually without interruption.

The race has been included as part of FINA's Marathon circuit (prior to 2007), and its appropriate successor: the FINA Open Water Grand Prix series.

References

Sport in Santa Fe Province
Open water swimming
Swimming competitions in Argentina